The Wolverine Open was a golf tournament on the LPGA Tour, played intermittently from 1955 to 1963. It was played at three courses in the Detroit, Michigan area: Forest Lake Country Club in Bloomfield Hills in 1955, Lochmoor Club in Grosse Pointe Woods in 1957, and Hillcrest Golf & Country Club in Mount Clemens in 1960 and 1963.

Winners
1963 Kathy Whitworth
1961-62 No tournament
1960 Joyce Ziske
1958-59 No tournament
1957 Mickey Wright
1956 No tournament
1955 Fay Crocker

References

Former LPGA Tour events
Golf in Michigan
History of women in Michigan